Ted Berman (December 17, 1919 – July 15, 2001) was an American film director, animator, and screenwriter, known for his work with Disney, including Fantasia, Bambi and The Black Cauldron.

Early life
Berman was born in East Los Angeles, California. He studied at the Chouinard Art Institute after growing up wanting to become an artist.

Career
Joining Disney in the 1940s, Berman started off as an animator, but focused on writing and directing in his later years. Berman was also a fine-arts painter. He served on the Disney staff for nearly 50 years. Berman worked on a number of successful theatrical releases by the Mouse House along with his work with The Wonderful World of Color and The Mickey Mouse Club. In the 1980s, he helped direct The Fox and the Hound and The Black Cauldron before he retired from Disney.

Filmography

Writing
Bedknobs and Broomsticks (1971) (Animation Story)
The Rescuers (1977) (Additional Story)
The Fox and the Hound (1981) (Screenplay)
The Black Cauldron (1985) (Story)

Director
The Fox and the Hound (1981)
The Black Cauldron (1985)

Animation
Sleeping Beauty (1959) (Character Animator)
101 Dalmatians (1961) (Character Animator)

Works
Fantasia (1940)
Bambi (1942)
Alice in Wonderland (1951)
Peter Pan (1953)
Lady and the Tramp (1955)
Mary Poppins (1964)
The Rescuers (1977)
The Fox and the Hound (1981)
The Black Cauldron (1985)

Death
He died at 81 on July 15, 2001, at his home in Los Angeles from heart failure in his sleep, survived by his wife Jacqueline, children, and grandchildren.

References

External links

Ted Berman at Find a Grave

American animated film directors
1919 births
2001 deaths
Animators from California
American male screenwriters
Animation screenwriters
Walt Disney Animation Studios people
American cartoonists
Writers from Los Angeles
Chouinard Art Institute alumni
People from East Los Angeles, California
United States Army personnel of World War II
Military personnel from California
Film directors from Los Angeles
Screenwriters from California
Burials at Hillside Memorial Park Cemetery
20th-century American male writers
20th-century American screenwriters